East Quoddy is a rural community on the Eastern Shore of Nova Scotia, Canada, in the Halifax Regional Municipality. It can be found along the eastern shore of Quoddy Harbour, an inlet of the Atlantic Ocean.

References

Communities in Halifax, Nova Scotia
General Service Areas in Nova Scotia